Bacchisa fruhstorferi is a species of beetle in the family Cerambycidae. It was described by Breuning in 1959. It is known from Java.

References

F
Beetles described in 1959